Cripplestyle is a hamlet in the civil parish of Alderholt in the county of Dorset, England. It lies close to the Dorset-Hampshire border.

Prior to 1894 Cripplestyle was in the parish of Cranborne.

The Ebenezer Congregational Chapel was opened in Cripplestyle on 11 December 1807. Samuel Williams, from Penywaun in Brecon, was the minister there for 40 years. A small rectangular cob-built thatched building, originally of 'clay, heather, wood and thatch', it was extended twice, but despite efforts to preserve it, it collapsed in October 1976. There is a stone memorial at the site now. The Williams Memorial Chapel was built in 1888, in memory of Williams, and to replace the Ebenezer Chapel as a place of regular worship.

References

External links

Hamlets in Dorset